Guemar Airport is the airport for El Oued, Algeria . Located near the community of Guemar, it lies about 20 kilometres north of El Oued.

Opened to civil aviation since 1955.
The airport has two runways
1) Runway 13/31 is 3000 x 45 
2) Runway 02/20 is 2000 x 30

Airlines and destinations

Gallery

References

External links 
 Google Maps - Guemar
 
 
 Airport Services Management of Algeria

Airports in Algeria
Buildings and structures in El Oued Province
Airports established in 1955
1955 establishments in Algeria